Lucy is a surname. Notable people with the surname include:
 Autherine Lucy (1929-2022), first black student to attend the University of Alabama
 Charles Lucy, English historical painter of the Victorian era
 Donny Lucy, baseball player
 Gary Lucy, English television actor and model
 Sir Henry Lucy JP, an English journalist and humorist
 Jeffrey Lucy, former Chairman of the Australian Securities and Investments Commission
 Judith Lucy, Australian comedian
 Julie Ashton-Lucy, international field hockey umpire from Queensland, Australia
 Sir Thomas Lucy, builder of Charlecote Park in 1558
 Tom Lucy, international rower
 William Lucy, English clergyman

English-language surnames
French-language surnames